Major General Bert Göran Stenfeldt (born 12 August 1933) was a Swedish Air Force officer. Stenfeldt served as Chief of the Air Staff from 1987 to 1990 and as the commander of the First Air Group from 1990 to 1994.

Early life
Lönnbom was born on 12 August 1933 in Saint Paul Parish (Sankt Pauli församling) in Malmö, Malmöhus County, Sweden, the son of Harald Persson and his wife Agnes (née Stenfeldt).

Career
Stenfeldt became a sergeant pilot in 1951 and was commissioned as an officer in the Swedish Air Force in 1958 with the rank of second lieutenant, stationed in Blekinge Wing. He was promoted to Lieutenant in 1960 and from 1960 to 1966, Stenfeldt was posted at Skaraborg Wing. He attended the General Course at the Swedish Armed Forces Staff College in 1963, was promoted to captain in 1966 and attended the Staff Course at the Swedish Armed Forces Staff College from 1966 to 1968. Stenfeldt served in the staff of the First Air Group from 1968 to 1970 and in 1971 he was promoted to major and to lieutenant colonel.

Stenfeldt attended the Air Command and Staff College in United States from 1973 to 1974 and served as head of the Central Department in Section 1 of the Air Staff from 1976. Stenfeldt studied at the Swedish National Defence College in 1978 and in 1982. He was promoted to colonel in 1979 and appointed commander of the Helicopter Test Unit (Helikopterförsöksförbandet, HKP F). In 1982, Stenfeldt was promoted to senior colonel and appointed commander of the Norrbotten Wing and Upper Norrland air defence sector (F 21/Se ÖN). From 1984 to 1987, he served as head of the System Section (Systemsektionen) in the Air Staff. In 1987, Stenfeldt was promoted to major general and was appointed Chief of the Air Staff, a position he held for three years. His final assignment before retiring was as commanding officer of the First Air Group in Gothenburg from 1990 to 1994. Stenfeldt retired on 30 September 1994.

Personal life
In 1955, he married Maybritt Christensson.

In 2007, Stenfeldt became chairman of the Swedish Air Force Historic Flight. On 4 April 2019, Stenfeldt became an honorary member of the F 18 Kamratförening ("F 18 Friendship Association").

Dates of rank
1958 – Second lieutenant
1960 – Lieutenant
1966 – Captain
1971 – Major
1971 – Lieutenant colonel
1979 – Colonel
1982 – Senior colonel
1987 – Major general

Awards and decorations
  Swedish Air Force Volunteers Association Medal of Merit in silver (1989)

Honours
Member of the Royal Swedish Academy of War Sciences (1979)

References

External links

 

1933 births
Living people
Swedish Air Force major generals
People from Malmö
Members of the Royal Swedish Academy of War Sciences
Air Command and Staff College alumni